The hanging of Patrick O'Connor happened on June 20, 1834, in Dubuque, Michigan Territory, to a man charged with murder. O'Connor was an immigrant from Ireland to the United States. The hanging occurred after an attempted lynching of O'Connor on May 19, 1834. The O'Connor case and others like it showed that there was a need for formal laws on Iowa land. The trial of O'Connor was the first murder trial in Iowa.

Murder of O'Keaf
O'Connor was born in Ireland in 1797 and immigrated to Galena, Illinois, in 1826. Two years after arriving in the United States, he fractured his leg which resulted in a doctor amputating it. It is believed that this incident caused O'Connor to become "quarrelsome and a trouble maker". He shot a merchant, who survived the encounter. Some men wanted to lynch O'Connor, but they decided not to do so when O'Connor promised to them that he would leave Galena.

After leaving Galena, O'Connor traveled to Dubuque, Michigan Territory, to work in the lead mines. In 1833, during his time mining, O'Connor met fellow Irishman George O'Keaf. The two men built a cabin that was two miles south of Dubuque. On May 19, 1834, O'Keaf traveled to Dubuque to gather supplies and returned to the cabin with one of his friends at close to 2pm. After O'Connor, who was inside of the cabin at the time, refused to unlock the door, O'Keaf busted the door open with his shoulder. O'Connor was sitting in a bench that was on the opposite side of the door and he killed O'Keaf after shooting him once with a musket. The friend of O'Keaf went to the nearest cabin to tell them about the murder that had just happened. When multiple miners asked O'Connor why he shot O'Keaf, his only responses were "That is my business" and then ordered them to bury O'Keaf. Some of the miners wanted to hang O'Connor, but others wanted a trial. O'Connor was then taken to Dubuque.

Trial
The trial was held on May 20, 1834, making it the first murder trial in Iowa. O'Connor was given the right to select the jury and the trial took place outside under an elm tree. The jury, while sitting on a log, listened to the testimonies of witnesses. After the arguments from attorneys of both the prisoner and the prosecution, the jury declared that O'Connor was guilty of first degree murder. O'Connor was sentenced to be hanged on June 20, 1834. 

During the month after the trial, it was attempted for the crime to be pardoned or for there to be a commutation of the sentence. However, the governor of Missouri stated that he did not have the power to grant a pardon and President Andrew Jackson said that "Congress had not extended the laws of the United States to that part of the country". At 1pm on June 20, 1834, O'Connor was hanged.

Aftermath
Because of this incident and others like it, Congress provided laws for the Iowa territory. On June 28, 1834, President Jackson approved an act which extended the "boundaries of Michigan to the Missouri and White Earth rivers and embracing all the territory between the northern boundary of Missouri and the Forty-Ninth Parallel". Even though the act came too late to help O'Connor, it made it so that the people of the Black Hawk Purchase would have the authority and protection of the United States.

References

Lynching in the United States
Murder trials
History of Iowa
1834 in Michigan Territory